Sphenomorphus cryptotis  is a species of skink found in Vietnam.

References

cryptotis
Reptiles described in 2004
Taxa named by Ilya Darevsky
Taxa named by Nikolai Loutseranovitch Orlov
Taxa named by Ho Thu Cuc
Reptiles of Vietnam